The Holy See is not a member of the United Nations (not having applied for membership) but was granted permanent observer state (i.e., non-member state) status on 6 April 1964. In that capacity, it has the right to attend all sessions of the United Nations General Assembly, the United Nations Security Council, and the United Nations Economic and Social Council to observe their work. Accordingly, the Holy See has established permanent observer missions in New York and in Geneva and has been able to influence the decisions and recommendations of the United Nations.

History

Relationship with the League of Nations
During a 1919 conference at the League of Nations, a motion was proposed to encourage international cooperation with the Holy See. The motion, encouraged by delegations in Belgium and Switzerland, was adopted by a majority of participants, although it met resistance from the United Kingdom and Italy. Reports indicated that the Holy See regretted its exclusion and wished to be admitted in the League of Nations.

In 1923 however, the Holy See took a different position and stated that its only competency was in matters of elucidation of questions of principle in morality and public international law. In 1924, the Holy See received an invitation from a British delegate to become a member of the League, but this proposition received no official reaction from other member States.

When it became clear that the ongoing territorial dispute with Italy (resolved with 1929's Lateran Treaty) precluded it from joining the League, the Vatican supported the activities of l'Union Catholique d'Etudes Internationales, a lobby group whose members mainly comprised Catholic activists employed as League officials. Prominent members included Gonzague de Reynold and Oskar Halecki, while the League's first and second Secretaries-General, Eric Drummond and Joseph Avenol, were sympathetic to the organisation's aims. The group had particular success in promoting the Holy See's vision of international affairs within the International Committee on Intellectual Cooperation, forerunner to UNESCO.

Non-participation between 1944 and 1964
In 1944, the Holy See made tentative enquiries about the possibility of becoming a UN Member. US Secretary of State Cordell Hull replied that: 

Secretary Hull did not distinguish between the Holy See and the Vatican City State; and second, that at the time membership in the United Nations was still limited to the Allies of World War II. Neither the Holy See nor the Vatican City State chose to apply for UN membership at that time.

Permanent observer since 1964

Since 6 April 1964, the Holy See has been a permanent observer state at the United Nations. In that capacity, the Holy See has since had a standing invitation to attend all the sessions of the General Assembly, the United Nations Security Council, and the United Nations Economic and Social Council to observe their work, and to maintain a permanent observer mission at the UN headquarters in New York. Accordingly, the Holy See has established a Permanent Observer Mission in New York and has sent representatives to all open meetings of the General Assembly and of its Main Committees.

As a matter of diplomatic courtesy, since 1964, the Holy See was also allowed to make formal policy statements in the General Assembly, both during the General Debates and during the discussion of the various separate issues contained in the agenda of the General Assembly. Notably, popes Paul VI, John Paul II, Benedict XVI, and Francis were invited to address the General Assembly.

In addition, the Holy See was invited to observe all open meetings of the intergovernmental subsidiary bodies of the General Assembly. The Holy See was frequently allowed to participate in the private negotiations leading to the adoption of the General Assembly's decisions and resolutions. The Holy See was not allowed, however, to co-sponsor draft decisions or resolutions, to make points of order or to exercise the right of reply. If the Holy See wished to circulate written proposals or position papers, it required the assistance of a member state that was willing to present those proposals or papers as its own.

The Holy See took advantage the prerogatives of its observer status to incorporate its Christian values within the decisions and recommendations of the United Nations. Notable was a successful effort, in cooperation with like-minded countries, to ensure the adoption of a United Nations Declaration banning all forms of Human Cloning, and it opposed the adoption of a resolution on sexual orientation and gender identity proposed by the European Union in the General Assembly; a similar UNHRC-specific resolution on LGBT rights proposed by the Republic of South Africa was successfully passed in the United Nations Human Rights Council.

Opposition to status
From 1999, the non-governmental organization Catholics for Choice lobbied against the participation of the Holy See in the United Nations. Supporters of this campaign argued that the Holy See is a religious organization and not a state, and that, therefore, it should not have the right to participate, in a position analogous to that of states, in the intergovernmental decision-making process on social, cultural, and economic matters. They also cited the lack of equal status for other religions and the Vatican representatives' history of pushing Catholic views on reproductive health.

Confirmed status in 2004
In 2004, the UN General Assembly confirmed the Holy See's status as a Permanent Observer. Currently the Holy See has the right to participate in the general debate of the General Assembly and to intervene in the discussion of any issue inscribed in the agenda of that assembly. It has the right to participate in all meetings open to all Member States, the right to make points of order and to exercise the right of reply, the right to circulate proposals and position papers as official documents, and the right to co-sponsor draft resolutions and decisions. Commenting on its status, Archbishop Celestino Migliore, the then Holy See Permanent Observer to the United Nations, said "We have no vote because this is our choice." He added that the Holy See considers that its current status "is a fundamental step that does not close any path for the future. The Holy See has the requirements defined by the UN statute to be a member state and, if in the future it wished to be so, this resolution would not impede it from requesting it."

Across the United Nations System

At the United Nations Economic and Social Council
The Holy See is also an observer to the United Nations Economic and Social Council (ECOSOC), attending all of its meetings and able to make proposals and policy statements regarding of all issues that are of its concern. Since 22 July 1977, the Holy See has had a standing invitation to attend the sessions of ECOSOC's regional commissions on an equal footing with those State Members of the United Nations who are not members of those regional commissions. In addition, the Holy See enjoys full membership in some specialized agencies of the United Nations dependent on ECOSOC such as WIPO, ITU, and UPU. In order to follow the work of those ECOSOC subsidiary bodies and agencies that meet regularly in Geneva, the Holy See has established a Permanent Observer Mission in Geneva.

At the United Nations Security Council
Having observer status at the United Nations, the Holy See is also able to observe all open meetings of the United Nations Security Council. Occasionally, the Holy See has asked and been allowed to make statements in public meetings of the Security Council. The Permanent Observer spoke against war in Iraq shortly before the invasion, on the regulation of armaments, and on the protection of civilians during armed conflicts. On some occasions, the Holy See has submitted documents to the Security Council, such as the 29 April 2003 statement of Patriarchs and Bishops of Iraq on religious freedom.

Meanwhile, the Holy See does not recognize People's Republic of China, a permanent member of UNSC, as a legitimate state.

At the world conferences on social and economic issues
The Holy See has also been an active participant in the World Conferences on social and economic issues convened by the United Nations. It had a major impact on the negotiations and outcome of the 1994 Cairo Population Conference, the 1995 Beijing Conference on Women, and the 2001 General Assembly Special Session on HIV/AIDS.

Multilateral treaties

Negotiation of multilateral treaties
Since the Holy See is legally capable of ratifying international treaties, and does ratify them, it is invited to participate – on equal footing with States – in the negotiation of most universal, International law-making treaties held under the auspices of the United Nations. Being a negotiating party, it is able to make substantive proposals, reject the proposals of other negotiating parties, request a vote, and even vote. The Holy See has participated actively in the negotiation of the 1998 Rome Statute of the International Criminal Court, the 1997 Terrorist Bombing Convention, and the 2006 Convention on the Rights of Persons with Disabilities, among others.

Participation in multilateral treaties
The Holy See is a state-party to numerous multilateral treaties:

See also

Permanent Observer of the Holy See to the United Nations
Permanent Observer of the Holy See to the United Nations in Geneva
:Category:Permanent Observers of the Holy See to UNEP and UN-HABITAT
Multilateral foreign policy of the Holy See
Foreign relations of the Holy See
Legal status of the Holy See
United Nations General Assembly observers

References